Dino Tadello (born 27 December 1954) is a former Italian male mountain runner and after masters athlete, who won 1987 World Mountain Running Championships.

Biography
He won also one national championships at individual senior level.

Achievements

National titles
Italian Mountain Running Championships
Mountain running: 1988

References

External links
 Dino Tadello profile at Corriere delle Alpi

1954 births
Living people
Italian male mountain runners
Italian masters athletes
World Mountain Running Championships winners
20th-century Italian people